In the Aztec mythology, Temazcalteci (Nahuatl temāzcalli 'sweat bath' + tecitl 'grandmother')  was the goddess of steam baths. According to Sahagún, this goddess was the goddess of medicine, Toci, venerated by doctors. She was also worshiped by those who had temazcals (baths) in their houses.

Sources and external links
 Sahagún, Fr. Bernardino de - Historia General de lad Cosas de la Nueva España. México: Editorial Porrúa, S. A., 1979.
 Find A Goddess site
 GodChecker
 Oaxaca tourist bureau

Aztec goddesses
Health goddesses

es:Temazcalteci